Trayning is a town in the north-eastern Wheatbelt region of Western Australia, 236 kilometres (147 mi) east of the state capital, Perth, on the Nungarin–Wyalkatchem Road.

History
When the Dowerin to Merredin railway was planned in 1910, Trayning was selected as the site for a siding. Land was set aside for a townsite to be named Trayning Siding in 1910, but when it was surveyed and gazetted in 1912 it was named Trayning. The townsite is named after Trayning Well, the Aboriginal name of a nearby water source on an old road from Goomalling to the eastern goldfields. It was first recorded by a surveyor in 1892, and allegedly derives from the Aboriginal word During meaning "snake in the grass by the campfire".

Railway
In 1932 the Wheat Pool of Western Australia announced that the town would have two grain elevators, each fitted with an engine, installed at the railway siding. Trayning was one of the first five locations of bulk wheat transport on the Western Australian Government Railways and consequently one of the starting points of the Co-operative Bulk Handling system of grain receival points.

The Trayning to Merredin railway line has been designated a Tier 3 line in the wheatbelt railway network, and was closed in October 2013.

Present day
The town is a tourist base for exploring local wildflowers, has a single-officer police station, a K-7 primary school with 50 students that was opened in 1912, a 25-metre swimming pool and two 18-hole golf courses. An attraction is the annual Trayning Tractor Pull.

The surrounding areas produce wheat and other cereal crops. The town is a receival site for Cooperative Bulk Handling.

Politics
Polling place statistics are shown below showing the votes from Trayning in the federal and state elections as indicated.

References

Notes

Bibliography

External links

 Shire of Trayning
 Australia's Golden Outback – Trayning
 Groundwater study of the Trayning townsite (Department of Agriculture)

Towns in Western Australia
Grain receival points of Western Australia
Shire of Trayning